Seguenzia platamodes is a species of extremely small deep water sea snail, a marine gastropod mollusk in the family Seguenziidae.

Description
The length of the shell attains 3.28 mm.

Distribution
This marine species occurs off the Loyalty Islands and New Caledonia.

References

External links
 Marshall B.A. (1991). Mollusca Gastropoda : Seguenziidae from New Caledonia and the Loyalty Islands. In A. Crosnier & P. Bouchet (Eds) Résultats des campagnes Musorstom, vol. 7. Mémoires du Muséum National d'Histoire Naturelle, A, 150:41-109
 To Encyclopedia of Life
 To World Register of Marine Species

platamodes
Gastropods described in 1991